The 2023 Monte Carlo Rally (also known as the 91e Rallye Automobile Monte-Carlo) was a motor racing event for rally cars that held over four days between 19 and 22 January 2023. It marked the ninety-first running of the Monte Carlo Rally, and was the first round of the 2023 World Rally Championship, World Rally Championship-2 and World Rally Championship-3.

Sébastien Loeb and Isabelle Galmiche were the defending rally winners. However, they did not defend their titles as Loeb's schedule was conflict with the 2023 Dakar Rally. Andreas Mikkelsen and Torstein Eriksen were the defending rally winners in the WRC-2 category, while Sami Pajari and Enni Mälkönen were the defending rally winners in the WRC-3 category.

Sébastien Ogier and Vincent Landais won the rally. Their team, Toyota Gazoo Racing WRT, were the manufacturer's winners. Nikolay Gryazin and Konstantin Aleksandrov initially finished first in the World Rally Championship-2 category. However, they were given a five-second time penalty, handing the win to Yohan Rossel and Arnaud Dunand.

Background

Entry list
The following crews entered into the rally. The event was opened to crews competing in the World Rally Championship, its support categories, the World Rally Championship-2 and World Rally Championship-3, and privateer entries that were not registered to score points in any championship. Ten entered under Rally1 regulations, as were twenty-seven Rally2 crews in the World Rally Championship-2.

Itinerary
All dates and times are CET (UTC+1).

Report

WRC Rally1

Classification

Special stages

Championship standings

WRC-2 Rally2

Classification

Special stages

Championship standings

WRC-3 Rally3
No Rally3 crews entered the round.

Notes

References

External links
  
 2023 Monte Carlo Rally at eWRC-results.com
 2023 Monte Carlo Rally at rally-maps.com 

2023 in French motorsport
2023 in Monegasque motorsport
2023 World Rally Championship season
January 2023 sports events in France
2023